Cold Light is a 2004 Icelandic film directed by Hilmar Oddsson.

Cast

Release
Cold Light premiered in Iceland on 1 January 2004. It was released on 26 September 2005.

Awards
It was Iceland's submission to the 77th Academy Awards for the Academy Award for Best Foreign Language Film, but was not accepted as a nominee.

Edda Awards in Iceland

In 2004 Cold Light won the Edda Awards in Iceland for ‘Best Film’, ‘Actor or Actress of the Year’ (Ingvar Eggert Sigurðsson), ‘Supporting Actor or Supporting Actress of the Year’ (Kristbjörg Kjeld), ‘Director of the Year’ (Hilmar Oddsson) and ‘Professional Category: Sound/Vision’ (Sigurður Sverrir Pálsson, for the cinematographer).  They were nominated at the Edda Awards in Iceland for ‘Actor or Actress of the Year’ (Áslákur Ingvarsson), ‘Supporting Actor or Supporting Actress of the Year’ (Helga Braga Jónsdóttir) and ‘Supporting Actor or Supporting Actress of the Year’ (Snæfríður Ingvarsdóttir). 

European Films Awards

In 2004 at the European Films Awards, Cold Light was nominated for the Audience Award for the ‘Best Director’ for Hilmar Oddisson. It was nominated for the Audience Award for ‘Best Acrtor’ (Ingvar Eggert Sigurðsson). 

Festróia International Film Festival

Festróia International Film Festival in 2004, Cold Light won a Silver Dolphin for ‘Best Actor’ (Ingvar Eggert Sigurðsson). It also won the ‘Prize of the City of Setubal (Hilmar Oddsson) and it was nominated for the Golden Dolphin award for (Hilmar Oddsson).

Mar del Plata Film Festival

In 2004, Cold Light won the ‘SIGNIS Award’ for (Hilmar Oddsson). It was also nominated for ‘Best Film’ (Hilmar Oddsson). 

Verona Love Screens Film Festival

In 2005, at the Verona Love Screens Film Festival, Cold Light won the ‘Audience Award’ for (Hilmar Oddsson). They won ‘Best Artistic Contribution’ for Best Cinematography (Sigurður Sverrir Pálsson) and they won ‘Best Film’ (Hilmar Oddsson).

See also

List of submissions to the 77th Academy Awards for Best Foreign Language Film

References

External links

2004 films
2000s Icelandic-language films
2004 drama films
Films directed by Hilmar Oddsson
Icelandic drama films